AREMA may refer to:
American Railway Engineering and Maintenance-of-Way Association, a North American railway industry group
Arema FC, a football club based in Malang, Indonesia
Antoko Revolisionera Malagasy (literally "Malagasy Revolutionary Party"), a political party in Madagascar